The P-12-42, also known as the Speed Merchant, was a streamlined,  locomotive built between 1957–1958 by Fairbanks-Morse, specifically to operate on each end of the Talgo train produced by American Car and Foundry. This model represented F-M's attempted entry into the lightweight locomotive market, but only four of the low-slung units were produced: the first pair was purchased by the New York, New Haven and Hartford Railroad for their John Quincy Adams train (New York, New York to Boston, Massachusetts), while the second pair went to the Boston and Maine Railroad for their Speed Merchant train (Boston, Massachusetts to Portland, Maine).

The P-12-42's eight-cylinder opposed piston engine was rated at  after 1950, but train lighting and other ancillary loads ("hotel" power) used about 25% of output, leaving  for traction. The P-12-42 was one of the first locomotives to have its prime mover configured to run at a constant speed, with traction generator output regulated solely by excitation.

The New Haven locomotives were dual-powered, and came equipped with third-rail pickups to allow them to operate in New York's Grand Central Terminal, becoming the first dual-power locomotives light enough to operate on the Park Avenue Viaduct.

F-M expected to sell many more units to the New Haven, and to spin the technological advance off into a line of passenger units, including a proposal that used a Train Master-style carbody, but with financial troubles preventing F-M from extending financing to customers, the cash-strapped New Haven ultimately opted to purchase a fleet of sixty EMD FL9s instead, as GM financing was available for the purchase.

The New Haven's Talgo train was sold to Ferrocarril de Langreo for service in Spain, in 1962, and their locomotives sat unused afterwards, until being scrapped in 1971. The Boston and Maine's train remained in service until 1964.

See also
The Roger Williams, a lightweight, high speed DMU train, built for the New Haven.
The Dan'l Webster, a lightweight train, operated by the New York, New Haven and Hartford Railroad.

References

Further reading
 
 
 
  — also covers the P-12-42.

External links
 Magazine advertisement from late 1955 depicting an artist's rendition of the New Haven's "John Quincy Adams" Talgo train
 Late 1955 magazine advertisement depicting the Fairbanks-Morse "Speed Merchant" locomotive

B-2 locomotives
Boston and Maine Railroad
Electro-diesel locomotives
P-12-42
New York, New Haven and Hartford Railroad locomotives
North American streamliner trains
600 V DC locomotives
Passenger locomotives
Railway locomotives introduced in 1957
Scrapped locomotives
Standard gauge locomotives of the United States
Streamlined diesel locomotives